Audrey Wise (née Brown; 4 January 1932 – 2 September 2000) was a British Labour politician and Member of Parliament.

Life
Audrey Wise was born Audrey Brown in Newcastle upon Tyne, the daughter of a former Labour councillor. She married her husband John, a dispensing optician, in 1953.

At the age of 21 she became a Tottenham borough councillor. She served as MP for Coventry South West from February 1974-79, a period of tenuous Labour Government with marginal or no majorities. Despite Labour being in power, "at Westminster in the 1970s she was regarded as something of a left-wing nuisance, a state of affairs that she viewed as necessary and desirable." 
During the 1970s she was a leading member of the Institute for Workers' Control.

She visited Portugal in 1974 to report on and participate in the Carnation Revolution that overthrew the fascist dictatorship, recording her experiences and analysis in Eyewitness in Revolutionary Portugal. She was famously arrested on the picket line during the Grunwick dispute where Asian women workers were striking for union recognition.

With Jeff Rooker, she co-authored the Rooker-Wise Amendment to Denis Healey's 1977 budget which sought to freeze many annual fiscal changes to mitigate global inflation; this amendment introduced retrospective inflation-proofing on personal tax allowances (the tax-free portion of individuals' earnings), and resulted in £450 million being returned to taxpayers.

Losing her seat in the 1979 general election, she stood unsuccessfully in Woolwich in 1983. She was then elected as MP for Preston in 1987, which she held until her death in 2000. Wise was a member of the left-wing Campaign Group of Labour MPs. She was president of the shop staff union USDAW between 1991 and 1997.

As a member of the health select committee, she persuaded the committee to hold an inquiry into maternity services. The report, endorsed by the Conservative government, called for services to become more woman-centred, and recommended increased access to home births and water births.

She died on 2 September 2000 from a brain tumour, which had been diagnosed some five months earlier.
Her family described her death as "one fight she did not win".

The conflict between Audrey Wise and the Labour Whips was highlighted in the National Theatre play This House by James Graham in 2012.

She was survived by her two children: 
Valerie, who is also a political activist, and Ian.

Notes

References

External links 
 

1932 births
2000 deaths
Councillors in the London Borough of Haringey
Labour Party (UK) councillors
Labour Party (UK) MPs for English constituencies
Female members of the Parliament of the United Kingdom for English constituencies
Members of the Parliament of the United Kingdom for constituencies in Lancashire
UK MPs 1974
UK MPs 1974–1979
UK MPs 1987–1992
UK MPs 1992–1997
UK MPs 1997–2001
Deaths from brain tumor
Politicians from Newcastle upon Tyne
20th-century British women politicians
21st-century British women politicians
20th-century English women
20th-century English people
21st-century English women
21st-century English people
Women councillors in England